Diagnosis: Murder first season originally aired Fridays at 8:00-9:00 pm (EST). The season was released on DVD by Paramount Home Video. It included the 1991 pilot "It Never Entered My Mind" from the fourth season of Jake and the Fatman.

Cast
Dick Van Dyke as Dr. Mark Sloan
Scott Baio as Dr. Jack Stewart
Victoria Rowell as Dr. Amanda Bentley
Barry Van Dyke as Steve Sloan
Michael Tucci as Norman Briggs
Delores Hall as Delores Mitchell

Episodes

References

Diagnosis: Murder seasons
1993 American television seasons
1994 American television seasons